The Marriage of William Ashe is a 1916 British silent drama film directed by Cecil Hepworth and starring Henry Ainley, Alma Taylor and Stewart Rome. It is an adaptation of the 1905 novel The Marriage of William Ashe by Mary Augusta Ward.

Cast
 Henry Ainley as William Ashe 
 Alma Taylor as Lady Kitty Bristol 
 Stewart Rome as Geoffrey Cliffe 
 Violet Hopson as Mary Lyster 
 Lionelle Howard as Eddie Helston 
 Alice De Winton as Mme d'Estrees 
 Mary Rorke as Lady Tranmere 
 Henry Vibart as Lord Parham 
 Amy Lorraine as Lady Parham 
 Fred Rains as Dean Maitland

See also
The Marriage of William Ashe 1921 a 1921 American film

References

Bibliography
 Low, Rachael. The History of British Film, Volume III: 1914-1918. Routledge, 1997.

External links

1916 films
1916 drama films
British drama films
British silent feature films
Films directed by Cecil Hepworth
Films set in England
British black-and-white films
Films based on British novels
1910s English-language films
1910s British films
Silent drama films